Canetti is a surname. Notable people with the surname include:

Cecilia Canetti (born 1987), Brazilian female former water polo player
Ciça Canetti (born 1987), Brazilian female former water polo player
Elias Canetti (1905–1994), German language author
Jacques Canetti (1909–1997), French music executive and a talent agent
Manuela Canetti (born 1988), Brazilian female water polo goalkeeper
Marina Canetti (born 1983), Brazilian female former water polo player
Robert Canetti (born 1948), Israeli conductor, violinist, and professor
Veza Canetti (1897–1963), Austrian poet, playwright, and short story writer
Yanitzia Canetti (born 1967), Cuban author, translator, and editor

See also
Canetti Peak, a 400 m peak in the Friesland Ridge, Tangra Mountains, eastern Livingston Island in the South Shetland
Mycobacterium canetti, a novel pathogenic taxon of the Mycobacterium tuberculosis complex (MTBC)

References